James Hawker may refer to:
 James Hawker (poacher), English poacher
 James Collins Hawker, English-born explorer, surveyor, diarist and pastoralist of South Australia
 James Hawker (British Army officer), British Royal Artillery officer